El Boco Airport,  is an airport serving Quillota, a city in the Valparaíso Region of Chile.

The runway has  of grass overrun on the north end. There is high terrain nearby to the northwest.

See also

Transport in Chile
List of airports in Chile

References

External links
OpenStreetMap - El Boco
OurAirports - El Boco
FallingRain - El Boco Airport

Airports in Valparaíso Region